MJB is an American brand of coffee that is owned by Massimo Zanetti Beverage USA.

History

After the California Gold Rush, San Francisco became a center of coffee importing and roasting in the western United States, spawning such future industry giants as Folgers Coffee and Hills Brothers Coffee.

In 1881 Max J. Brandenstein (1860-1925), son of tobacco wholesaler Joseph Brandenstein, began producing roasted coffee in the San Francisco Bay Area. In 1899 he established a tea, spice and coffee import business in his name that took over his brand with the assistance of brothers Mannie, Charlie, and Eddie. The firm's name was later changed to the MJB Co. to minimise sibling rivalry and disguise their German-Jewish origins.

In her memoir "Coffee, Martinis and San Francisco," published by Presidio Press in 1978, Ruth Bransten McDougall, the granddaughter of the founder, wrote on page 94 that her father Mannie Brandenstein changed his name to Bransten to protect the business against anti-German antipathies during World War I, as well as to please his wife, whose family originated from France.

In 1910 Mannie Brandenstein debuted what was to become a well-known advertising campaign: "MJB Coffee Why?", beginning with a promotional fans giveaway at the Johnson-Jeffries boxing match in Reno, Nevada.  In time, signs bearing the slogan appeared all over San Francisco.

"In 1898, Edward Norton, of New York, was granted a United States patent on a vacuum process for canning foods, subsequently applied to coffee. Others followed. Hills Brothers, of San Francisco, were the first to pack coffee in a vacuum, under the Norton patents, in 1900. M.J. Brandenstein & Company, of San Francisco, began to pack coffee in vacuum cans in 1914."

For the Panama-Pacific International Exposition of 1915 MJB created a temporary "ultramodern" coffee house featuring a giant cup and saucer on the roof with the illuminated word "WHY".

In the 1940s, MJB got endorsement from several of the industry’s glitterati, including the Cherokee Strip film stars promoting the brand. Moreover, a 1960s TV campaign of MJB saying "tastes good when it should" featured actress Teri Garr. 

Ruth Branstein McDougall, Mannie’s daughter wrote a book named ‘Under Mannie’s Hat’ that is a collection of memoirs of their family and brand history.

MJB was acquired by Nestle in 1985. The San Francisco headquarters were closed in 1997. In 1999 Sara Lee Corp. acquired MJB, Hills Brothers, and Chase & Sanborn from Nestle.

In 2005 MJB, Hills Brothers, Chase & Sanborn, and Chock Full o' Nuts were purchased by Massimo Zanetti Beverage from Sara Lee for US$82.5 million.

References

External links
MZB-USA.com

Coffee brands
Massimo Zanetti brands
1881 establishments in California
History of San Francisco
Nestlé brands
Sara Lee Corporation brands
Food and drink in the San Francisco Bay Area
Drink companies based in California